BankID is an electronic identification system in Sweden. With a usage rate of 94% among smartphone users, it is the single largest such service in Sweden by a large margin, and is administered by Finansiell ID-Teknik BID AB that is owned by several Swedish and Scandinavian banks. In 2022, Bank-id had about 8.4 million active users and was supported by over 6000 web services. Only individuals with a Swedish personal identity number can acquire Bank-id.

Bank-id has existed in following variations:
 Bank-id on file (on computer)
 Bank-id on card (connected to a token device)
 Mobile Bank-id (mobile based solution)
 Bank-id in mobile (a discontinued SIM card based solution)

Example of usage areas are Swish payments, bank login, login to e-government, and access to medical records via Vårdguiden 1177.

There is also a separate personal electronic identification service in Norway that goes by the name BankID developed and released by Norwegian banks in 2004, and while it functions similarly, it is completely independent from the Swedish BankID.

Variations

Bank-id on file 
The service BankID, also called BankID på fil, was launched in 2003. A soft certificate and a secret encryption key is stored on the computer's hard drive, and still works even if the files are moved between computers, which might be a security risk.

To use Bank-id on a personal computer it is required that Bank-id säkerhetsprogram (BISP) is installed within the system the files are stored. Criticism has been pointed out that it is an overly platform dependent solution that requires the customers to either have Microsoft Windows or Mac OS X. Early versions included support for Linux, but were phased out in 2014.

Bank-id on card 
Bank-id på kort (English: Bank-id on card) was launched in 2005. A secret cryptographic key is stored in the smart card's chip, that works like a hard certificate, which is regarded as more secure as it usually will require physical access to the card for it to work. The card can be a bank card or a pure bank-id card. It can be delivered with or without a photograph, and can work as a identity document. This card work in tandem with a special card reader, called bankdosa or säkerhetsdosa, with a numeral keyboard to enter codes. Some banks have the chip integrated in the card reader so it work without card. Bank-id on card work without any special software in the computer or mobile, but long codes needs to be entered into the device. There is a special software to transfer codes via a USB cable.

Mobile bank-id 

Mobilt bank-id (English: Mobile bank-id) was launched in October 2011, and is an electronic identification for modern smartphones from certain manufactures that is combined with a mobile application. It can be used as login or signing via the web on an ordinary PC, where the mobile work as a separate security device ("säkerhetsdosa"), and for login via bank and government mobile applications. The secret cryptographic key is stored in the mobile application (Bank-id säkerhetsapp), that works as a soft certificate. The e-service supplier (the business or government the user shall identify themselves towards) have a validation server.

In 2014, about half of all smartphone users in Sweden used Mobile Bank-id. In five years the number of users almost doubled to 94 percent of all smartphone users. In 2019 all participating banks issued Mobile Bank-id, which does not apply to the other two solutions.

References 

Financial services in Sweden
Software companies of Sweden
Companies based in Stockholm